Saddlers United Football Club (formerly known as SPD United FC) is a football club from Saint Kitts and Nevis based in Basseterre that competes in the Saint Kitts Premier Division.

References 

Football clubs in Saint Kitts and Nevis